The Minister of Children and Families is a Councilor of State and Chief of Norway's Ministry of Children and Family Affairs. Since 14 October 2021, Kjersti Toppe has held the position. The ministry is responsible for policy and public operations related to children, youth and families as well as consumer rights. Major agencies subordinate to the ministry include the Consumer Council and the Directorate for Children, Youth and Family Affairs.

The position was created as the Minister of Families and Consumer Affairs on 1 August 1955 as part of Gerhardsen's Third Cabinet. The Labour Party's Aase Bjerkholt as the inaugural minister. While at first a consultative minister, she received her own ministry on 21 December 1956. Sixteen people from four parties have held the position. It has been a favored position of the Christian Democratic Party, who have held it in all center-right governments they have participated in except during the four weeks of Lyng's Cabinet, when it was held by Karen Grønn-Hagen of the Centre Party. The minister position was discontinued on 8 May 1972, when the portfolio was transferred to the Minister of Consumer Affairs and Government Administration. The position was recreated under the original name on 16 October 1989 and occupied by Solveig Sollie of the Christian Democratic Party. When her successor Matz Sandman of the Labour Party took over the following year, it was renamed the Minister of Children and Family Affairs. With the appointment of Karita Bekkemellem (Labour) in 2005, the position changed name the Minister of Children and Equality, receiving responsibility for the government's anti-discrimination policies. She would be the first of six ministers during Stoltenberg's Second Cabinet, with the three last representing the Socialist Left Party. With these the position changed to its current name, but lost its responsibilities for kindergartens.

The position has been dominated by females—the only males to hold the position were Matz Sandman (Labour, 1990–91), Audun Lysbakken (Socialist Left, 2009–12) and Kjell Ingolf Ropstad (Christian Democratic, 2019–21). Manuela Ramin-Osmundsen (Labour) became the first non-white minister of Norway when she was appointed in 2007. Both she and Lysbakken were forced to resign after issues related to cronyism. Two people have held the position twice: Bjerkholdt and Karita Bekkemellem. With a tenure of ten years, Bjerkholdt has held the position the longest.

Key
The following lists the minister, their party, date of assuming and leaving office, their tenure in years and days, and the cabinet they served in.

Ministers

Notes

References

Children
Ministers for children, young people and families
1955 establishments in Norway